Crematogaster arnoldi is a species of ant in tribe Crematogastrini. It was described by Forel in 1914.

References

arnoldi
Insects described in 1914